Monica Kim is a Canadian singer-songwriter who had a hit in Colombia.

Life
Kim was born in Germany in 1947 and grew up in Stuttgart, immigrating with her parents to Canada in 1952. At 30 her husband bought her a piano. Kim's first audiences were church members and then she branched out to create her own recordings and to perform in hotel lounges and concert halls. 

In 1989 Kim spent four years performing in Colombia, Venezuela and Argentina. After her return to Canada in 2002, Kim began to teach vocals.

In 2008 KAB Productions released Kim's CD, Dreams Can Come True

Discography
 Dreams Can Come True (2008)

Television appearances
 1983 - Weekend with the Stars
 1982 - Backstage CHCH-TV, Performance, Interview with Global TV News, Variety Club Telethon, Weekend with the Stars
 1981 - The Alan Thicke Show 4 appearances
 1980 - Bob McLean Show
 1979 - CBC Television Special

References

External links
 Monica Kim's Webpage
 KAB Productions - Canadian Music Production and Promotion

Canadian women singers
German emigrants to Canada
German people of Canadian descent
Canadian performers of Christian music
Musicians from Ontario
Year of birth missing (living people)
Living people